The 1948–49 1re série season was the 28th season of the 1re série, the top level of ice hockey in France. Eight teams participated in the league, and Chamonix Hockey Club won their 12th championship.

First round

Paris Group

Alpes Group

Final round

External links
Season on hockeyarchives.info

Fra
1948–49 in French ice hockey
Ligue Magnus seasons